Horwill is a surname. Notable people with the surname include:

 Chris Horwill, English engineer
 Frank Horwill (1927–2012), UK Athletics senior level 4 coach
 James Horwill (born 1985), Australian Rugby Union player